An Introduction to the Study of Indian History is a classic work of Indian historiography by Damodar Dharmananda Kosambi first published in 1956.

Through this book Kosambi revolutionised Indian historiography with his realistic and scientific approach. He understood history in terms of the dynamics of socio-economic formations rather than just a chronological narration of "episodes" or the feats of a few great men – kings, warriors or saints. In the very first paragraph of his classic work, An Introduction to the Study of Indian History, he gives an insight into his methodology as a prelude to his life work on ancient Indian history:

"The light-hearted sneer 'India has had some episodes, but no history' is used to justify lack of study, grasp, intelligence on the part of foreign writers about India's past. The considerations that follow will prove that it is precisely the episodes — lists of dynasties and kings, tales of war and battle spiced with anecdote, which fill school texts — that are missing from Indian records. Here, for the first time, we have to reconstruct a history without episodes, which means that it cannot be the same type of history as in the European tradition."

Contents 

Scope and Methods
Special methods needed for Indian history
Available materials
The underlying philosophy
The Heritage of Pre-class Society
Prehistoric archaeology
Tribal society
Tribal survivals
The Vetala cult
Higher local cults
Festival and rites
Civilization and Barbarism in the Indus Valley
The Indus cities
Indus trade and religion
Maintenance of class structure
Food production
The Aryans in the Land of the Seven Rivers
Aryans outside India
Rigvedic information
Panis and new tribes
Origins of caste
Brahmin clans
The Aryan Expansion
Aryan as a mode of living
Study of legend and myth
Yajurvedic settlements
The eastward drive
Tribes and dynasties
The mark of primitive tribes
The new brahminism
Beyond brahminism; ritual, food production and trade
The need for radical change
The Rise of Magadha
New institutions and sources
Tribes and kingdoms
Kosala and Magadha
Destruction of tribal power
New religions
Buddhism
Appendix: Punch-marked coins
The Formation of a Village Economy
The first empire
Alexander and the Greek accounts of India
The Asokan transformation of society
Authenticity of the Arthashastra
The pre-Asokan state and administration
The class structure
Productive basis of the state
Interlude of Trade and Invasions
After the Mauryans
Superstition in agrarian society
Caste and the village; the Manusmriti
Changes in religion
The settlement of the Deccan plateau
Commodity producers and trade
The development of Sanskrit
Social functions of Sanskrit literature
Feudalism from Above
Early feudal developments
Growth of villages and barbarism
The India of the Guptas and Harsa
Religion and the development of village settlement
The concept of property in Land
Maryurasarman's settlement in the west coast
Village craftsmen and artisans
Feudalism from Below
Difference between Indian and English feudalism
The role of trade in feudal society
The Muslims
Change to feudalism from below; slavery
Feudal prince, landlord and peasant
Degeneracy and collapse
The bourgeois conquest

Reception 
According to A. L. Basham, "An Introduction to the Study of Indian History is in many respects an epoch making work, containing brilliantly original ideas on almost every page; if it contains errors and misrepresentations, if now and then its author attempts to force his data into a rather doctrinaire pattern, this does not appreciably lessen the significance of this very exciting book, which has stimulated the thought of thousands of students throughout the world."

References

External links 
 "Early Indian History and the Legacy of D.D. Kosambi" by Romila Thapar. Resonance, June 2011. 
 Kosambi, Marxism and Indian History by Irfan Habib. EPW, July 26, 2008. Pdf. 
 Science as a Cognition of Necessity by Vivek Monteiro. EPW, July 26, 2008
 Kosambi, Damodar Dharmanand (1975) [1956] An Introduction to the Study of Indian History. Mumbai: Popular Prakashan

History books about India
Historiography of India